"I Can't Read You" is the fourth single from New Zealand-British singer Daniel Bedingfield's debut studio album, Gotta Get thru This. It was released on 7 April 2003 and peaked at number six on the UK Singles Chart, number 34 in Ireland, and number 93 in the Netherlands.

Track listings
UK CD single
 "I Can't Read You" (single version)
 "Inflate My Ego"
 "James Dean (I Wanna Know)" (Todd Edwards Lifeline vocal edit)
 "I Can't Read You" (video)

UK cassette single
 "I Can't Read You" (single version)
 "James Dean (I Wanna Know)" (Todd Edwards Lifeline vocal edit)

Credits and personnel
Credits are lifted from the Gotta Get Thru This album booklet.

Studio
 Mastered at Sony Music Studios (London, England)

Personnel

 Daniel Bedingfield – writing, production
 Lewis Taylor – guitar, bass
 David "Deebo" Hart – additional guitar
 Greg Lester – additional guitar
 Dean Livermore – additional drums
 Miles Bould – percussion
 Stephen Emmanuel – co-production, mixing
 Ned Douglas – engineering
 John Davis – mastering

Charts

Weekly charts

Year-end charts

References

2002 songs
2003 singles
Daniel Bedingfield songs
Polydor Records singles
Songs written by Daniel Bedingfield